Hara is a village in Kuusalu Parish, Harju County in northern Estonia, on the territory of Lahemaa National Park. It is located on the Juminda Peninsula, on the shore of Hara Bay.

A former Soviet submarine station is located in Hara.

References

Villages in Harju County